The Savage is a lost 1926 silent film comedy directed by Fred C. Newmeyer and starring Ben Lyon and May McAvoy. The film was produced and distributed by First National Pictures. Based on a short story by Ernest Pascal.

Cast
Ben Lyon as Danny Terry
May McAvoy as Ysabel Atwater
Tom Maguire as Professor Atwater
Philo McCullough as Howard Kipp
Sam Hardy as Managing Editor
Charlotte Walker as Mrs. Atwater

References

External links

lobby poster(Wayback) and its larger version(Wayback Machine)

1926 films
American silent feature films
Films directed by Fred C. Newmeyer
Lost American films
American black-and-white films
1926 romantic comedy films
Films with screenplays by Jane Murfin
First National Pictures films
American romantic comedy films
1920s English-language films
1920s American films
Silent romantic comedy films
Silent American comedy films